The Press Trust of India Ltd., commonly known as PTI, is the largest news agency in India. It is headquartered in New Delhi and is a nonprofit cooperative among more than 500 Indian newspapers. It has over 500 full-time employees , including about 400 journalists. It also has nearly 400 part-time correspondents in most of the district headquarters of the country. PTI also has correspondents in major capitals and important business centres around the world. It took over the operations of the Associated Press of India from Reuters in 1948–49. It provides news coverage and information of the region in both English and Hindi.

Overview                                                                                                

PTI exchanges information with several other news agencies including 100 news agencies based outside India, such as Associated Press, Agence France-Presse, The New York Times and Bloomberg L.P. Major Indian subscribers of PTI include The Hindu, The Times of India, The Indian Express, Hindustan Times, The Statesman, The Tribune, News 18, NDTV, India Today, the All India Radio, Doordarshan, and The Wire. PTI has offices in Bangkok, Beijing, Colombo, Dubai, Islamabad, Kuala Lumpur, Moscow, New York City, and Washington D.C.

Its current chairman is Aveek Sarkar. He is also the vice chairman of ABP group.

History of PTI

See also
 Asian News International, another major news agency based in Delhi
 Hindustan Samachar
 Samachar
 United News of India
 United Press of India

Citations

General bibliography

External links

 
 
 

Indian companies established in 1947
Mass media companies of India
News agencies based in India